Muhammad Yahya ibn Noorullah Baloch Rasool Nagari (died 31 May 2020) was a Pakistani Quran reciter and recitation teacher. He was known for his skills in Tajwid and Qira'at.

Biography 
Rasool Nagari studied the rules of recitation under Izhar Ahmad Thanvi. He joined Jamia Aziziyah in Sahiwal as a teacher in 1970 and taught there for about fifty years. His students include Saud Al-Shuraim. 
Rasool Nagari was fondly called  'the father of Qira'at' by his followers.
He died on 31 May 2020, aged 75. On 1 June 2020, he was buried in Okara, Pakistan. 

Of his family, his son Izhar Ahmad Baloch is patron of Markazi Jamiat Ahle Hadith, Sahiwal District, brother Hafeez Ullah Baloch is a Pakistan Tehreek-e-Insaf leader and son-in-law Abdul Basit Baloch is a journalist .

Literary works
 As-hal al-Tajwid fi al-Quran al-Majeed
 Tuhfat al-Qur'a

References

Pakistani Quran reciters
Year of birth missing
2020 deaths
People from Okara, Pakistan
Baloch people